Jara, also known as Jera, is a Nigerian language reported to be spoken by 46,000 people in 2000. It is spoken in Borno and Gombe States, in the Biu, Kwaya-Kusar, Akko, and Yamaltu-Deba LGAs. It is an Afro-Asiatic language, in the Biu–Mandara branch of Chadic family.  Use of Jara is declining; it is being displaced by Fulfulde and Hausa.

References

Languages of Nigeria
Biu-Mandara languages